Linda Jean Hughes,  (born September 27, 1950) is a Canadian newspaper publisher.  She served as Chancellor of the University of Alberta from 2008 to 2012. Hughes was educated at the University of Victoria (1972 Honours BA). She worked for the Edmonton Journal from 1976 to her retirement in 2006, eventually rising to the position of Publisher and President, the first woman in Canada to hold the position of publisher of a major newspaper. She serves on the board of Torstar. In 2016, she was appointed to the Alberta Order of Excellence.

References

1960 births
Living people
Canadian newspaper publishers (people)
Chancellors of the University of Alberta
Journalists from British Columbia
University of Victoria alumni
Canadian women journalists
Members of the Alberta Order of Excellence
Canadian women non-fiction writers
People from Princeton, British Columbia
Writers from British Columbia